Tanielu Telea (born 16 June 1998 in New Zealand) is a New Zealand rugby union player who plays for the  in Super Rugby. His playing position is centre. He has signed for the Blues squad in 2019.

Reference list

External links
itsrugby.co.uk profile

1998 births
New Zealand rugby union players
Living people
Rugby union centres
Auckland rugby union players
Blues (Super Rugby) players
Counties Manukau rugby union players